RV Araon is a large icebreaker operated by the Government of South Korea.
The vessel was commissioned in 2009.
She supplies the King Sejong Station, and the Jang Bogo Station, South Korea's second  Antarctic research station.

She underwent her sea trials in January 2010, in the Ross Sea.
Her first foreign port of call was Lyttelton, New Zealand.

The first location her crew investigated, for a South Korean Antarctic base, in the Cape Burks area, was not deemed suitable, and she then  investigated the selected site in Terra Nova Bay.

In December 2011, she was instrumental in the rescue of the Russian trawler Sparta, trapped in Antarctic sea ice.

Her class notation is KRS1-Special purpose ship (Research vessel) PL10, DAT (-30 deg. C), HMS1, KRM1-UMA3, DPS2, NBS2.

References

2009 ships
Icebreakers
Ships of South Korea
South Korea and the Antarctic
Ships built by Hanjin Heavy Industries